Gumo is a community in Kumbungu District in the Northern Region of Ghana. It is a less populated community with a nucleated settlement pattern. Gumo is  located along the Tamale-Kumbungu trunk road. Inhabitants of the community are predominantly farmers. The women in the community are known for shea butter production.

See also

References 

Communities in Ghana
Populated places in Kumbungu District